Václav Neužil (born 4 October 1979) is a Czech actor.

Neužil was awarded the Czech Lion Award for Best Actor in Leading Role and Czech Film Critics' Award for Best Actor for his role in 2021 film Zátopek.

Selected filmography

Film
 The Seven Ravens (2015)
 Lost in Munich (2015)
 Anthropoid (2016)
 Ice Mother (2017)
 Patrimony (2018)
 Toman (2018)
 Dukla 61 (2018)
 National Street (2019)
 The Watchmaker's Apprentice (2019)
 Zátopek (2021)

Television
 The Fourth Star (2014) 
 Lajna (2017) 
 Svět pod hlavou (2017)
 Dabing Street (2018) 
 Zkáza Dejvického divadla (2019)  
 Třídní schůzka (2021)

References

External links
 

 
1979 births
Living people
Actors from Plzeň
Czech male film actors
Czech male stage actors
Czech male television actors
21st-century Czech male actors
Janáček Academy of Music and Performing Arts alumni
Czech Lion Awards winners
Czech male voice actors
Recipients of the Thalia Award